The Battle of Stephaniana was a small-scale battle between the forces of the Medieval Serbian Kingdom and the Emirate of Aydin, allies of Byzantine emperor John VI Kantakouzenos.  It was the first battle between the Serbs and Turks, as an earlier battle in Gallipoli was fought between troops sent by King Milutin and Turcopole Halil Pasha (1312).

The Emirate [Turkish] force, 3,100 strong, were in the process of returning to Anatolia to defend against a Latin attack on their main harbour, Smyrna. On their way they were attacked by a Serbian army under voivode Preljub, one of the most capable generals in the service of Stefan Dušan. The battle, which occurred sometime in May 1344, was won by the Turks, but was not able to thwart the ongoing conquest of Byzantine Macedonia by Dušan.

Background 
Both the Serbs and Bulgars who had existing kingdoms in the Balkans and various groups of Turks were by 1344 very active in the Byzantine Civil War (1341–47)

Byzantine civil war

Byzantine-Serbian wars

See also 
History of the Serbian-Turkish wars

References

Sources

Stephaniana
Stefan Dušan
1344 in Europe
Stephaniana
14th century in Greece
14th century in Serbia
1340s in the Byzantine Empire
Kingdom of Serbia (medieval)